Miladinović is a Serbian patronymic surname derived from a masculine given name Miladin. It may refer to:

Bojan Miladinović (born 1982), footballer
David Miladinović (born 1997), basketball player
Dejan Miladinović (1948 – 2017), opera director 
Igor Miladinović (born 1974), chess grandmaster
Igor Miladinović (born 1989), footballer
Ivan Miladinović (born 1994), footballer
Jovan Miladinović (1939 – 1982), footballer
Marko Miladinović (born 2000), tennis player

Serbian surnames
Slavic-language surnames
Patronymic surnames
Surnames from given names